Rylsk is a town and the administrative center of Rylsky District in Kursk Oblast, western Russia, located on the right bank of the Seym River (Dnieper's basin)  southwest of Kursk, the administrative center of the oblast. Population:    19,000 (1974).

History
Rylsk was first mentioned in a chronicle in 1152 as one of the Severian towns. It had become the seat of an appanage principality by the end of the 12th century before coming into the hands of Lithuanian rulers sometime in the 14th century. The Polish king Casimir IV made a grant of it to Dmitry Shemyaka's son Ivan, who had settled in Lithuania. Ivan's son Vasily defected to the Grand Duchy of Moscow, but Lithuanians held the town until 1522.

During the Time of Troubles, it was one of the first towns to welcome False Dmitry I as the Tsar. After the Ukraine's integration into the Russian Empire, Rylsk capitalized on the trade between Little Russia and Great Russia. Numerous merchants resided in the town. Today its population is the same as it had been about a century before.

Soviet authority in Rylsk was established in November 1917. During World War II, the town was occupied by the German Army from October 5, 1941 to August 31, 1943.

Administrative and municipal status
Within the framework of administrative divisions, Rylsk serves as the administrative center of Rylsky District. As an administrative division, it is incorporated within Rylsky District as the town of district significance of Rylsk. As a municipal division, the town of district significance of Rylsk is incorporated within Rylsky Municipal District as Rylsk Urban Settlement.

Attractions
The town does not retain many marks of antiquity. Its oldest buildings are three churches of the monastery of St. Nicholas, all erected in the mid-18th century. Some of the most prominent buildings in the town were commissioned by the Shelikhov merchants who traded with Alaska Natives in North America in the late 18th century, the most famous of whom, Grigory Shelekhov, was born in the town.  A monument was erected to his memory on the central square. The foremost of the town's churches are the Uspensky Cathedral (1811) and the Pokrovsky Cathedral (1822), both designed in a vernacular Neoclassical idiom and furnished with very lofty belltowers.

References

Notes

Sources

External links
 Official website of Rylsk
 Architectural and history guide to Rylsk

Cities and towns in Kursk Oblast
Rylsky Uyezd